Steven Clark (born 2 February 1982) is a footballer who plays as a midfielder. He is currently manager at Sporting Bengal.

Clark started as a trainee with West Ham United before moving to Southend United in 2002 for £50,000. After a season at the club he signed on for another year in June 2003. He was released in May 2004.

He had several clubs over a short period of time starting with the demise of what was Hornchurch. After Hornchurch folded, he moved to Dagenham & Redbridge then to Weymouth with various loan spells along the way. Clark then played for Fisher Athletic.Since 2022, Clark has been manager of Sporting Bengal.

References

External links

English footballers
Living people
1982 births
West Ham United F.C. players
Southend United F.C. players
Macclesfield Town F.C. players
Hornchurch F.C. players
Dagenham & Redbridge F.C. players
Weymouth F.C. players
Fisher Athletic F.C. players
Footballers from Greater London
Association football midfielders
English Football League players
National League (English football) players